Anssi Tapio Suhonen (born 14 January 2001) is a Finnish professional footballer who plays as a midfielder for 2. Bundesliga club Hamburger SV and the Finland national team.

Club career

Hamburger SV

Suhonen joined the youth academy of Hamburger SV in 2017, moving from the Finnish club KäPa. He made his professional debut with Hamburger in a 2–1 DFB-Pokal win over Eintracht Braunschweig 8 August 2021. He scored his first goal for HSV on 23 April 2022 in a 2-4 away win against Jahn Regensburg.

International career

He made his debut for the Finland national team on 17 November 2022 in a friendly match in Toše Proeski Arena, Skopje against North Macedonia.

References

External links

 Hamburger SV official profile
 Anssi Suhonen – SPL competition record
 

2001 births
Living people
People from Järvenpää
Finnish footballers
Finland youth international footballers
Hamburger SV players
Hamburger SV II players
Regionalliga players
Association football midfielders
Finnish expatriate footballers
Finnish expatriate sportspeople in Germany
Expatriate footballers in Germany
Käpylän Pallo players
Sportspeople from Uusimaa